Jinshan Subdistrict is a subdistrict of Hetang District in Zhuzhou, Hunan, China. The subdistrict has 4 villages and 3 communities under its jurisdiction. Its seat is Jingoushan Village.

History
The subdistrict of Jinshan was formed in 2005. In the year of 2005, Hetangpu ceased to be a separate township, it was divided to the three subdistricts of  Jinshan, Songjiaqiao and Guihua.

Subdivisions

4 villages
 Jinggoushan Village)
 Taiyang Village)
 Tongziping Village)
 Xinshi Village)

3 communities
 Liufang Community)
 Xianghua Community)
 Yanjiawan Community)

References

Hetang District
Towns of Hunan